Paul Leroy (13 January 1884 – 9 April 1949) was a French archer. He competed at the 1920 Summer Olympics, winning three medals, two silver and a bronze.

References

1884 births
1949 deaths
French male archers
Olympic archers of France
Archers at the 1920 Summer Olympics
Sportspeople from Seine-et-Marne
Olympic silver medalists for France
Olympic bronze medalists for France
Olympic medalists in archery
Medalists at the 1920 Summer Olympics